Rudesindus I (in office 877-907) was a medieval Galician clergyman.

References 
 Episcopologio Mindoniense. CAL PARDO, Enrique, 2003, .

External links 

  Official web site of the Diocese of Mondoñedo-Ferrol

9th-century Galician bishops
907 deaths